Katlego "Tsiki" Ntsabeleng (born 9 February 1998) is a South African soccer player who plays for FC Dallas in Major League Soccer.

Career

Youth and college
Born in Daveyton in South Africa, Ntsabeleng spent time with various clubs in South Africa including the Stars of Africa Academy team, which he joined in 2014. Ntsabeleng also appeared for the reserve teams of Kaizer Chiefs and Mamelodi Sundowns, before attending the University of Johannesburg, where he also played soccer.

In 2018, Ntsabeleng moved to the United States to play college soccer at Coastal Carolina University. In two seasons with the Chanticleers, he made 28 appearances, scoring nine goals and tallying eight assists. In his junior season, he earned All-Sun Belt First Team, Sun Belt Championship All-Tournament Team, United Soccer Coaches All-Southeast Region, and the Sun Belt's Newcomer of the Year. In 2019, he was again named Sun Belt First Team All-Conference.

After earning his degree, Ntsabeleng enrolled in a graduate program at Oregon State University where he played seasons with the Beavers, netting six goals and tallying ten assists in 25 appearances. He was named All-Pac-12 First Team and All-Far West Region First Team in his senior season.

While at college, Ntsabeleng played with USL League Two side Reading United during their 2019 season. He made five appearances for the team, finishing with a single assist to his name.

Professional 
On 11 January 2022, Ntsabeleng was selected 28th overall in the 2022 MLS SuperDraft by FC Dallas. On 11 February 2022, he signed a one-year deal with the club. Dallas head coach Nico Estevez cited Ntsabeleng's dynamism and dribbling: “He's very dynamic type of player. Really good energy. He plays with good tempo... and then his ability to be balanced with the ball while dribbling makes him a special player. And that’s what we saw before the draft. And this is what we're seeing so far in preseason. I think he's progressing in the right way. And he has earned his spot with us.” Estevez began converting Ntsabeleng into a box-to-box midfielder in his 4-3-3 system, with Ntsabeleng playing a similar role as Paxton Pomykal and Brandon Servania. 

He made his professional debut on 26 February 2022, appearing as a 77th-minute substitute during a 1–1 draw with Toronto FC. Ntsabeleng scored his first FC Dallas goal on 23 April 2022 vs Houston Dynamo, an 87th minute equalizer after appearing as a substitute in a come from behind 2–1 victory for FCD. His first MLS start came as a midfielder in a 2–2 draw against Sporting Kansas City on April 30 at Children's Mercy Park.

References

External links 
 
 

1998 births
Living people
Association football forwards
Coastal Carolina Chanticleers men's soccer players
Expatriate soccer players in the United States
South African expatriate sportspeople in the United States
FC Dallas draft picks
FC Dallas players
Kaizer Chiefs F.C. players
Major League Soccer players
Oregon State Beavers men's soccer players
Reading United A.C. players
South African expatriate soccer players
South African soccer players
South Africa youth international soccer players
University of Johannesburg alumni
USL League Two players